Papurana moluccana is a species of true frog. It is endemic to the Maluku Islands (the Moluccas) of Indonesia; specifically, it is known from Halmahera and Bacan. Common name Moluccas frog has been coined for it.

Taxonomy
Based on molecular data, the previously very diverse genus Hylarana was split in several genera, many of them previously treated as subgenera, in 2015. Molecular data from Papurana moluccana was not included in the study, and therefore its placement in Papurana is provisional, pending more morphological and molecular data.

Habitat and conservation
This presumably common species has been found in water-filled pits in a village. It might be threatened by logging. It is not known to occur in any protected areas.

References

moluccana
Amphibians of Indonesia
Endemic fauna of Indonesia
Taxa named by Oskar Boettger
Amphibians described in 1895